was a prominent and respected leader of the Saiga Ikki throughout the latter years of the Sengoku period of Feudal Japan. He is thought to be the younger brother of Suzuki Magoichi, possibly Shigehide.

He was also known as Saika Magoroku.

16th-century Japanese people